Alexander Parsonage may refer to:

 Alexander Parsonage (theatre director) (born 1980), English actor, writer and theatre director
 Alexander Parsonage (water polo) (born 1985), British water polo player